Smokey Mountain was a Filipino singing group formed by musical director, composer, and National Artist for Music Maestro Ryan Cayabyab and executive producer Judd Berlin. The original group was based in Manila, Philippines, and had James Coronel, Geneva Cruz, Jeffrey Hidalgo, and Tony Lambino as its original members while Jayson Angangan, Chedi Vergara, and Zhar Santos joined James Coronel for the second lineup after Geneva Cruz, Jeffrey Hidalgo, and Tony Lambino left the group. Eventually, James Coronel left to pursue a solo career and Anna Fegi replaced Shar Santos during the 1994 tour in Japan.

First batch
The first batch was discovered and developed by songwriter, arranger, and musical director Ryan Cayabyab.

The group was named after the Smokey Mountain garbage dump in Manila. The concept for their debut album cover came from the idea that they had to be dressed in ragged clothes to depict the then-dire situation of the scavengers living on the Smokey Mountain garbage dump.

In 1989, the group released its first self-titled pop album that consisted of songs revolving around social, environmental, and patriotic themes.  The group's first hit, Kailan (When), was number one on national airwaves for eight straight weeks and the album hit gold, platinum, and double-platinum status within months of its release.

In late 1990, the group went on the "Better World" tour, performing at the United Nations World Summit for Children in New York and representing the Philippines at the 5th ASEAN Song Festival in Surabaya, Indonesia.

In 1991, Smokey Mountain became only the second Filipino act (after Gary Valenciano) to participate on NHK's Kōhaku Uta Gassen.

In 1992, the band performed in Paris.

Second batch
Having to choose between formal schooling and a two-year, two-album contract for release in Europe and the U.S., Tony Lambino and Jeffrey Hidalgo left the group, while Geneva Cruz pursued a solo career & released her first solo album "I Like You". The popularity of the group already reached its peak at the time of the departure of the group's 3 members, however, Ryan Cayabyab held auditions to find new members to fill in the void of the 3 founding members who left the group. Ryan Cayabyab then reformed the group with remaining original member James Coronel and three new members Shar Santos, Chedi Vergara, and Jayson Angangan.  This second batch also had successful hits, such as Da Coconut Nut (about the benefits of the coconut tree), Paraiso (literally paradise; about a degrading environment filled with garbage and smog), and their own version of Kailan (boy version). They also won awards for both Paraiso, "Kahit Habang Buhay" and Tayo Na.

The media was very critical of the new members who joined James Coronel, however in 1992 at the Tokyo Music Festival the new lineup proved their worth as they won the grand prize in the contest. They also joined the Golden Kite Festival & won the 1st Place trophy, & had more tours in Asia and Europe.

Third batch
In around 1993, the group released its third and international album Know You Will. James Coronel left the group after completing promotional work for this album. The remnants of the latest batch released the fourth album Death Penalty and disbanded a year later. In 1998 BMG Records (now Sony Music Philippines) released the fifth and final album of the Smokey Mountain Smokiest Hits with 12 tracks.

Past band members
Geneva Cruz moved on to showbiz full-time.

Tony Lambino cut a solo album and wrote songs recorded by fellow artists, did musical theatre with the Cultural Center of the Philippines, among others, and anchored an early morning news program on ABS-CBN. He finished his undergraduate studies at the Ateneo De Manila University, cum laude, completed his master's degree at Harvard University as a Fulbright Scholar, and earned a Ph.D. from University of Pennsylvania's Annenberg School for Communication.  Tony Lambino also worked at the World Bank in Washington, D.C. and became head of communication at the International Rice Research Institute (IRRI).  He then became an Assistant Secretary of the Philippine Department of Finance.

Jeffrey Hidalgo completed his Chemical Engineering degree at the University of the Philippines and placed 11th when he took the board exam. In 2009, he studied film making at the New York Film Academy in Abu Dhabi. He has written songs in recent years and even competed in the Metropop Song Festival. He currently runs his own company which produces cleaning products.

James Coronel owns call centers in USA, Philippines, India, and Sri Lanka.

Shar Santos auditioned in the fourth edition of the reality TV show American Idol under the name Sharon Galvez, but was shut out of the semi-finals and now she is Sharon Kaylor.

Chedi Vergara also released her self-titled album "Chedi" with some success and she joined in Teatro and she also has a band but now she lives in Brisbane, Australia.

Jayson Angangan returned to his own native land in Ilagan, Isabela.

Anna Fegi joined the group in 1994 for the final tour in Japan as she replaced Shar Santos.  Anna has gone on to release 2 solo albums under the Sony BMG label, performed on the hit show ASAP, toured with cruise line Royal Caribbean International, and performed in several musicals for Atlantis Productions in both Manila and Singapore.  She also owns and operates a successful music school, Brown Academy of Music, in Cebu.

Reunited for charity in 2011 and 2020
In March 2011, all Smokey Mountain members re-united for the first time in 15 years to record a new song for Japan earthquake relief entitled I FEEL WHAT YOU FEEL. The group has strong ties to Japan as some members lived in Tokyo during the peak of their popularity in the early 1990s.  Due to the members now being spread out all over the globe, the song was recorded separately and then edited together in a studio.

In May 2020, the members again reunited virtually for a Bayanihan Musikahan special.  They performed a "Paraiso/Better World medley as well as "Da Coconut Nut."  The performance was shown on ABS-CBN as well as streamed as a fundraising effort for the coronavirus pandemic.  There was a rerun on May 9 on the Facebook page of Bayanihan Musikahan.  Six of the eight members were interviewed by Iza Calzado during the May 9 special.

The group held another virtual reunion on June 30 for the benefit of World Wildlife Fund.

Chronology of lineup
Original lineup:  
James Coronel
Geneva Cruz
Tony Lambino
Jeffrey Hidalgo

2nd. Lineup 
James Coronel
Jayson Angangan
Chedi Vergara
Shar Santos

3rd. Lineup 
Jayson Angangan
Chedi Vergara
Shar Santos
Anna Fegi (replaced Shar Santos for Japan tour)

Albums
Smokey Mountain (1989, Universal Records)
 Not All The World Is America
 Mama
 Street People
 Earth Song
 Better World
 Kailan
 Escape
 Can This Be Love
 Steal To Eat
 Sabihin Mo

Paraiso (1991, BMG Music Philippines)
 King Philip
 Nahan Ka
 Da Coconut Nut
 Paraiso
 Sama Na Kayo
 Wanna Say No
 Kahit Habang Buhay
 Hideaway
 Best Friend
 Kailan (Boy Version)
 Freedom

Paraiso (Japan Edition) (1992, BMG Japan)
 King Philip
 Paraiso
 Tayo Na (Come On)
 Nahan Ka
 Sama Na Kayo
 Wanna Say No
 Kahit Habang Buhay
 Da Coconut Nut
 Hideaway
 Best Friend
 Kailan (Boy Version)
 Freedom

Know You Will (1993, BMG Music Philippines)
 One Less Lonely Heart
 I Believe In You
 A.S.A.P.
 Why Do You Tell Me
 Stand Up
 I'm In Love With You
 She Has Gone
 Without You
 Shall We Dance
 We Can Change The World

Singles (1993, BMG Japan)
 Dakishimetai (I'm In Love With You)
 Two Hearts (Japanese Song)
 Stay Away
 Tokyo Rhapsody

Death Penalty (1994, BMG Music Philippines)
 Death Penalty
 When Doors Close
 Leave Me forever
 Ikaw Lang
 What's Wrong With Dat
 Learn To Love
 You Can't Expect
 Sama 'Ko (Interlude)
 You Make Me Feel Good
 I Get So Lonely
 Ai Shite Ruyo
 Magbalik Ka Sana
 Sabi Mo
 Being Free
 We Share The Earth

Smokiest Hits (1998, BMG Music Philippines)
 Paraiso
 Kailan
 Da Coconut Nut
 I Believe In You
 Kahit Habang Buhay
 Can This Be Love
 Mama
 Nahan Ka
 One Less Lonely Heart
 Sabi Mo
 What's Wrong With Dat
 Better World

A Song For Japan (Single) (2011, Ivory Music & Video)
I Feel What You Feel

Greatest Hits (Digitally Remastered) (2012, Ivory Music & Video)
 Kailan
 Can This Be Love
 Da Coconut Nut
 Kahit Habang Buhay
 Paraiso
 Mama
 Sabihin Mo
 Nahan Ka
 What's Wrong With Dat
 Tayo Na (Come On)
 Street People
 Sabi Mo
 Earth Song
 Better World
 Kailan (Boy Version)

A Bayanihan Musikahan Special (COVID-19) (2020, ABS-CBN)
 Da Coconut Nut (Tropical Version)
 Better World/Paraiso (Medley)

Covers by other artists 
In the 2000s, the song "Kailan" and "Can This Be Love" were covered by singers Sarah Geronimo and Juris and the Philippine acoustic band MYMP in the present generation and has been mostly covered until today by many other Filipino artists even on television especially the 2012 Primetime Series Ina, Kapatid, Anak by singer Bryan Termulo.

"Kailan" was also covered by Gary Valenciano and Noel Cabangon.

"Da Coconut Nut" was also covered by a P Pop Female Group BINI in 2020.

Notable singles
Note that until recent years, artists in the Philippines never release stand-alone singles.
Better World
Can This Be Love
Kailan
Mama
Sabihin Mo
Da Coconut Nut
Freedom
Hideaway
Kahit Habang Buhay
Kailan (Boy Version)
Nahan Ka
Paraiso
Tayo Na
A.S.A.P.
I Believe In You
One Less Lonely Heart
She Has Gone
Ai Shite Ruyo
Ikaw Lang
Leave Me Forever
Magbalik Ka Sana
Sabi Mo
What's Wrong With Dat
When Doors Close

Filmography

TV

Kōhaku Uta Gassen appearances

References 

Filipino pop music groups
Musical groups established in 1989
Musical groups disestablished in 1995
Musical groups from Metro Manila